St-Blaise-Lac railway station (previously "St-Blaise BN") is a railway station in the municipality of Saint-Blaise, in the Swiss canton of Neuchâtel. It is an intermediate stop on the standard gauge Bern–Neuchâtel line of BLS AG.

Services 
 the following services stop at St-Blaise-Lac:

Gallery

References

External links 
 
 

Railway stations in the canton of Neuchâtel
BLS railway stations